The flag of Belgorod Oblast, a federal subject of Russia, was adopted on June 22, 2000. The flag consists of a blue cross, the four cantons colored (clockwise from top left) white, green, black and red.  The white canton is charged with the seal of Belgorod Oblast, consisting of a lion at rest and an eagle above it. The ratio of the flag is 2:3.

References

Flag of Belgorod Oblast
Flags of the federal subjects of Russia
Belgorod
Belgorod